Subham Ghosh (born 7 October 1998) is an Indian cricketer. He made his first-class debut for Tripura in the 2018–19 Ranji Trophy on 12 November 2018. He made his Twenty20 debut on 18 January 2021, for Tripura in the 2020–21 Syed Mushtaq Ali Trophy. He made his List A debut on 28 February 2021, for Tripura in the 2020–21 Vijay Hazare Trophy.

References

External links
 

1998 births
Living people
Indian cricketers
Tripura cricketers
Place of birth missing (living people)